Swedish berries are red  berry-shaped soft chewy candies which are manufactured by the candy company Maynards. The name Swedish Berries is trademarked by Vanderlei Candy, a division of Cadbury Canada. Their ingredients include sugar, glucose syrup, modified corn starch, citric acid, artificial flavours, mineral oil, carnauba wax, colour, and concentrated pear juice.  

Swedish Berries are similar in taste and consistency to Swedish Fish, another Maynards product.

See also
 List of confectionery brands

Brand name confectionery